Slanted and Enchanted: Luxe & Reduxe is a compilation album by Pavement released on October 20, 2002. It contains the band's 1992 album, Slanted and Enchanted, in its entirety, as well as outtakes and other rarities from that era, some of which had previously been unreleased.

Release
Matador Records released Luxe & Reduxe on October 20, 2002, alongside the Slow Century DVD. It features 48 songs, including the entire original disc and, in addition, 3 outtakes of which one is an unreleased song and the other two are alternate takes, plus the B-sides from the "Summer Babe" and "Trigger Cut" singles, 5 songs from two different John Peel sessions, the 4-track EP Watery, Domestic, and 13 tracks of a live performance of the band held at the Brixton Academy in London on December 14, 1992.

Luxe & Reduxe reached number 5 in the US Billboard Top Independent Albums and number 152 in the US Billboard 200 charts.

Critical reception

Luxe & Reduxe received critical acclaim from critics.

Track listing

Disc one Slanted & Enchanted

 Slanted Sessions

 John Peel sessions, June 23, 1992

Disc two Watery, Domestic
 Watery, Domestic

 Watery Sessions

 John Peel sessions, December 16, 1992

 Live Brixton Academy, London, December 14, 1992

Charts

References

2002 compilation albums
Pavement (band) albums
Peel Sessions recordings
B-side compilation albums
Matador Records compilation albums